Brijendra Kumar Rao is an Indian anesthesiologist, critical care specialist, medical administrator and the chairman of the Board of Management of Sir Ganga Ram Hospital, New Delhi. He heads the department of critical care medicine and anesthesiology at the hospital and is a member of the Board of Governors of the Medical Council of India. He has attended several medical conferences to deliver keynote addresses.

Honours
The Government of India awarded him the third highest civilian honour of the Padma Bhushan, in 2009, for his contributions to medical science.

Early life
Dr. B.K. Rao was born in village Majra Gurdas, Rewari district, Haryana, India on 23 March 1954 in yadav family. He obtained MBBS and MD degrees from Maulana Azad Medical College, Delhi. He married his classmate, Dr. Manju Mehra, who retired as Dy. MS of G.B. Pant Hospital, Delhi.

References

External links 
 

Recipients of the Padma Bhushan in medicine
Indian anesthesiologists
Indian medical administrators
Medical Council of India
20th-century Indian medical doctors
Medical doctors from Delhi
Living people
1954 births